The prefix thio-, when applied to a chemical, such as an ion, means that an oxygen atom in the compound has been replaced by a sulfur atom.  This term is often used in organic chemistry.  For example, from the word ether, referring to an oxygen-containing compound having the general chemical structure , where R and R′ are organic functional groups and O is an oxygen atom, comes the word thioether, which refers to an analogous compound with the general structure , where S is a sulfur atom covalently bonded to two organic groups. A chemical reaction involving the replacement of oxygen to sulfur is called thionation or thiation.

Thio- can be prefixed with di- and tri- in chemical nomenclature.

Examples
 Thioamide
 Thiocyanate
 Thioether
 Thioketone
 Thiol
 Thiophene
 Thiourea
 Thiosulfate

See also
 Organosulfur compounds
 IUPAC nomenclature of organic chemistry

References

Chemistry prefixes
Prefixes